Beal Bank is an American bank, which was founded by Texas-based entrepreneur D. Andrew "Andy" Beal. It includes two separately chartered banks, Beal Bank and Beal Bank USA. Each entity is insured by the Federal Deposit Insurance Corporation (FDIC).

As wholesale banks, they do not offer consumer loans or checking accounts, and generally purchase loans within the secondary market rather than originating them. As of June 30, 2022, the banks had combined total assets of more than $19.1 billion and combined total capital of more than $3.5 billion.

History
Beal Bank was founded in 1988 in Dallas, TX. Throughout the 1990s, the company purchased undervalued real estate and savings and loan assets.

In 2000, the company purchased more than $1 billion of commercial loans from the Small Business Administration. The company moved its headquarters from Dallas to Plano after buying the former headquarters of the petroleum company, FINA Inc. and began increasing its staff. Throughout its history, Beal Bank has purchased undervalued assets, including power company bonds during the California electricity crisis and debt backed by jetliners following September 11 attacks in 2001. The company acquired the Torrance, California-based Southern Pacific Bank, its three branches and $834 million in deposits in 2003. In 2004, it opened Beal Savings Bank, which later became Beal Bank USA, in Las Vegas, Nevada.

Between 2004-2007, the company slowed its asset acquisition and began to let its loans run off. During this time, assets shrank from $7.7 billion to $2.9 billion. From 2008-2009, Beal Bank expanded, hiring analysts and evaluating mortgage bonds, debt and other assets being sold by financial institutions as a result of the financial crisis of 2007-2008. By 2009, the company had purchased nearly $5 billion in assets, including $1.8 billion in residential loans, a $465 million loan to the chemical company Lyondell and some of the assets of 15 failed banks around the U.S. As a result, total reported net income rose from $281 million in 2008 to $559 million in 2009, and its assets increased to $9.2 billion. In 2009, Beal Bank acquired New South Federal Savings Bank in Alabama. New South's online-only banking subsidiary, UmbrellaBank.com, continues to operate as a division of Beal Bank.

In January 2010, Beal Bank acquired Charter Bank of Santa Fe after the bank began having problems with its commercial loans before its assets were transferred to Beal Bank. Its branches were later sold to Washington Federal in June 2011.

In 2015, Beal Bank through affiliates originated around $1.5 billion in loans with $3.3 billion in equity capital and a leverage ratio of nearly 50 percent. In 2017, the company had $2.3 billion in equity capital.

Operations

Beal Bank

Beal Bank opened in 1988, with $3 million in capital operating from a single branch in Carrollton, Texas. The bank initially bought assets from Resolution Trust Corporation, a government-owned company that liquidated real estate and savings-and-loan assets. Throughout the late 1980s and 1990s, the bank purchased the assets from failing savings and loans banks, including the maximum number of mortgage assets allowed by law from a San Antonio bank in 1989. By 1996, the bank was considered the most profitable bank in Texas, and reported a net income of $44.8 million, revenue of $143.5 million and $1.2 billion in assets.

As of December 31, 2022, Beal Bank reported capital in excess of $793 million and assets around $6.6 billion. Beal Bank has 6 branches in 4 states and offers certificate of deposit accounts, money market accounts, statement savings accounts,  and IRA CDs.

Beal Bank USA

Beal Bank USA is headquartered in Las Vegas, and shares a common brand with Beal Bank. It was founded in 2004 as Beal Savings Bank, and was renamed Beal Bank Nevada in 2007, and Beal Bank USA in 2011.

Beal Bank USA has 11 branches across 10 states. As of December 31, 2022, it reported capital in excess of $2.8 billion and assets in excess of $25.9 billion.

Other affiliates
Through affiliated companies, both banks are active in commercial real estate acquisition as well as individual loan and loan portfolio acquisition. They also originate and fund loans and loan participations secured by real estate, energy, power, gas, manufacturing, timber, transportation and distribution, and other tangible assets. Affiliated companies include: CSG Investments Inc. and CLG Hedge Fund, LLC. UmbrellaBank.com (a division of Beal Bank) and MyCDBank.com (a division of Beal Bank USA) are online banking affiliates.

References

External links
CLG Hedge Fund, LLC
CSG Investments Inc.
Loan Acquisition Corporation
MyCDBank.com
UmbrellaBank.com

Banks based in Texas
Banks based in the Dallas–Fort Worth metroplex
Companies based in Plano, Texas
1988 establishments in Texas
Banks established in 1988